Subaru Tecnica International (in ), or STI (prior to 2006, STi), is Subaru Corporation's motorsports division. STI, along with Prodrive of the UK, specialized in the preparation of a variety of vehicles for the Subaru World Rally Team which competed in the World Rally Championship (WRC). It was founded in 1988 by Subaru Corporation (then known as Fuji Heavy Industries), the parent company of Subaru, to promote the company's performance-oriented identity.

History

Subaru Tecnica International Inc. (STi) was established in 1988 by Fuji Heavy Industries to take over all of Subaru's motorsport activities and participate in the World Rally Championship (WRC). Subaru is now seen as one of the world's top rally racing teams.

STi was founded by Noriyuki Koseki and Ryuichiro Kuze in 1988. Previously, Koseki had helped prepare a Subaru FF-1 that was entered into the 1971 Baja 500 by San Bernardino Subaru dealer Jack Coyle. Although the FF-1 did not finish that year, it was able to complete the 1973 race and is now part of the Subaru of America historical collection. Koseki would go on to campaign Subarus privately in the Safari Rally starting in 1979.

Endurance record
STi president Ryuichiro Kuze partnered with British firm Prodrive in 1989 to develop a rally car using the Subaru Legacy chassis. The resulting performance model was the Legacy RS, which produced  mated to a five speed gearbox and weighing just over 2,600 pounds; it was manufactured by Subaru to homologate the type for FIA Group A racing. The vehicle had a top speed of 155 miles per hour, which was considered extremely powerful at the time.

One of the first activities that STi carried out was setting the world record for  endurance driving using a fleet of three modified Subaru Legacy RS sedans, averaging  over most of January 1989. The founder of STi, Noriyuki Koseki, coordinated the FIA World Land Endurance Record attempt and drove one of the cars. The Legacy RS used a 2.0-liter EJ20 turbo engine; STi modified the record-setting cars by tuning the suspension and improving the aerodynamics. That November, Subaru began marketing an upgraded Legacy RS with many of the same STi modifications as the Legacy RS Type RA (Record Attempt), limited to a production run of 100 examples. Low-volume Type RA production continued after that initial model, and in 1992 the Legacy Touring Wagon STi was marketed with similar modifications.

World Rally Championship

Subaru had participated in WRC races since 1980, albeit with limited success by 1988, when STi was founded. Subaru first campaigned the Prodrive-developed Legacy RS in the 1990 WRC season, finishing fourth in the constructor's standings that year. Despite adding Colin McRae to the Subaru World Rally Team in 1991 and winning three straight British Rally Championships from 1991 to 1993 (McRae/Ringer, 1991–92; Burns/Reid 1993) the Legacy RS did not win an individual WRC race until the 1993 Rally New Zealand (McRae/Ringer).

In 1992, with its rally competitors fielding smaller and lighter automobiles, Subaru began to sell the Impreza WRX (World Rally eXperimental) and homologated it for Group A as the Impreza 555; a Prodrive-modified Impreza 555 was campaigned starting with the 1994 WRC season and the new WRC car immediately achieved a podium finish on its debut, with Ari Vatanen coming second at the 1993 1000 Lakes Rally. The Impreza 555 featured a 2.0-litre intercooled turbocharged engine with 250 horsepower, upgraded suspension that could take on more aggressive potholes and jumps, as well as a short shifting transmission which made switching gears more accessible and quicker. 

Like the Legacy RS before it, an Impreza WRX Type RA was marketed in Japan for 1992; the RA deleted power windows, air conditioning, and the anti-lock braking system. In 1994, Subaru introduced the WRX STi; the STi were taken from the regular production line and modified to improve output and stiffen the chassis compared to the regular WRX. Meanwhile in the WRC, the Impreza 555 gave Subaru the Constructor's Championship in the World Rally Championship for three consecutive years between 1995 and 1997.

STi introduced the first of what it would eventually call its "S-line" of limited production cars in 1998, celebrating its consecutive streak of WRC constructor's championships as well as the 40th anniversary of Subaru: the 22B was limited to just 400 cars, reportedly selling out in 30 minutes. The 22B was followed by a string of limited production special editions of the WRX STi with outputs that exceeded the Japanese car manufacturers' "gentleman's agreement" to keep output below : S201 (2000), S202 (2002), S203 (2004), and S204 (2005).

At the end of 2008, Subaru announced that it would withdraw from the WRC starting with the 2009 season, citing the ongoing global recession.

Nürburgring 24 Hours
STI first competed in the annual Nürburgring 24 Hours race in 2008. Prior to that, Subaru had used the Nordschleife circuit to prove its production models since 1992. The WRX STI was first raced at the track's 24 Hours event in 2005 by a private team, finishing 14th overall and 2nd in its class. In 2008, the first factory-backed entry finished 57th overall and 5th in the SP6 class. For 2009, STI switched to the SP3T class (production cars equipped with a turbo engine with a displacement of 2-litres or less) and finished 33rd overall, 5th in the SP3T class.

Ahead of the 2010 event, driver Tommi Mäkinen drove a prototype WRX STI (GVB, widebody sedan), covering a Nordschleife lap in 7 minutes 55 seconds; the car was specially prepared with a lightweight aluminum bonnet and a larger turbo from the R205 production car. That year STI campaigned the WRX STI (GRB, widebody hatchback) to 24th overall and 4th in the SP3T class. In 2011, STI claimed the SP3T class title and finished 21st overall. That year, the S206 was released with a limited-production NBR (Nürburgring) Challenge Package, which replaced the steel roof with one made of carbon fiber, and was equipped with a special unfinished ("dry") carbon rear wing.

STI repeated as the SP3T class champion in 2012, but finished second in 2013 (26th overall). With the next generation of the WRX STI (VA) debuting in 2014, STI finished 4th in class, 32nd overall. Subaru took its third SP3T class win in 2015, finishing 18th overall, and repeated as SP3T class champions in 2016.

Subaru were unable to repeat their title in 2017, with the car forced to retire due to a fire in the engine compartment; at the time, the team were in second place within the class. The team won its fifth and sixth SP3T class championships in 2018 (62nd overall) and 2019 (18th overall).

Due to the difficulties of racing overseas during the COVID-19 pandemic, Subaru withdrew from the 2020 and 2021 races. Subaru entered the 2022 Nürburgring 24-Hour Race, held in late May, but was forced to retire before the end of the race due to a tire blowout leading to a crash. Before the crash, the WRX STI NBR Challenge 2022 was in second place for the SP3T class.

SUPER GT

STI also participates in the GT300 class of the Super GT series, campaigning the Legacy B4 GT300 starting in 2009, then switching to the BRZ GT300 from 2012 onward. In 2021, Subaru won the series championship with the updated BRZ GT300. Previously, the Subaru team's best finishes were fourth place (in 2011 and 2013).

Future development
At the 2022 Tokyo Auto Salon, Subaru unveiled the STI E-RA Concept, an all-wheel drive two-seat racing car developed by STI. The motors were developed and manufactured by Yamaha Motor Company. Because the car was designed to meet the requirements of the FIA Electric GT Championship, which is scheduled to hold its inaugural season in 2023, the automotive press have speculated that STI intend to campaign the E-RA, which will require the car to be homologated with a street-legal version under GT3 rules.

Subaru models with STI trim

STI versions of the Impreza, Forester and the Legacy have been marketed as limited edition vehicles in certain markets. STI also designs upgraded parts, mostly suspension related, for use on other Subaru vehicles.

The Subaru Impreza WRX and the Subaru Legacy B4 both come in high performance STI editions (formerly capitalized "STi" before the 2006 model year), designed by STI. The STI offers many advantages over the WRX, such as a six-speed manual transmission (different from the 2015+ WRX 6MT) with a helical (Suretrac in '04 models) limited slip front differential, driver controlled center differential(DCCD), IHI VF39 turbocharger (VF43 in 2007, VF48 from 2008 on), BBS lightweight alloy wheels, a mechanical rear limited slip differential and Brembo brakes. The WRX STI has Recaro style bucket seats and a MOMO steering wheel.

The WRX STI was the first and so far only STI vehicle made available to North American consumers. While the WRX was first released for the North American market in 2001 for the 2002 model year, the limited production Impreza WRX STI sedan with 300 hp and 310 foot pounds of torque did not hit the market until 2004, with a base price tag between $35,000-$40,000.

STI also released Legacys kitted out in full STI trim. These are rare and sought after by Subaru enthusiasts. They were only released new in Japan (JDM) and New Zealand (NZDM). In 2016 an STI kit was built for the redesigned Crosstrek models which included STI branded wheels, hatchback spoiler, and shift knobs for both automatic and manual variants.

STI has released an STI Forester.

Some Subaru enthusiasts have requested that the manufacturer install the STI engine in the BRZ to provide extra power, but there is concern that a more powerful BRZ would compete directly with the WRX. Drawings of a BRZ STI exist online and concepts have been shown at auto shows, but Subaru has yet to release an official statement.

S-line
The highest-performance automobiles sold by Subaru are limited-production models tuned by STI and designated as the "S-line". There is also a line of limited-production cars with upgraded performance noted as "tuned by STI" or "tS".

References

External links

 STI Official Japanese website
 STI Official English website
 SPT (Subaru Performance Tuning) 

Subaru
Auto parts suppliers of Japan
Automotive companies established in 1988
Official motorsports and performance division of automakers
Mitaka, Tokyo